The D. L. Clark Company was founded in 1886 in Allegheny, Pennsylvania, now part of Pittsburgh, by David L. Clark (1864–1939), an Irish-born candy salesman. In 1921, Clark Brothers Chewing Gum Company was spun off as a separate corporation.  In 1955, when the family-owned D. L. Clark company was sold to Beatrice Foods, they had production facilities in Pittsburgh and Evanston, Illinois.  Beatrice sold it in 1983 to Leaf, and they in turn sold Clark in 1991, though Leaf retained the rights to Clark's Zagnut and P. C. Crunchers bars.  The new owner, entrepreneur Michael P. Carlow, would operate it under the umbrella of the Pittsburgh Food & Beverage Company.

The Pittsburgh Food and Beverage Company entered bankruptcy in 1995, and many assets from the D. L. Clark Company, such as the rights to the Clark Bar, were sold.  The assets of D. L. Clark were purchased by Pittsburgh businessman James Clister for $3.2 million, and operated under the newly formed Clark Bar America, Inc.  Following a subsequent bankruptcy, its assets were acquired by Necco (New England Confectionery Company) in 1999 for $4.1 million ($ million today).

Clark's chewing gum spinoff, renamed Clark Gum Company, was sold in 1931 to Philip Morris, who held it until 1973, when they sold the rights to Clark Gum to Reed's Candy, an HP Hood subsidiary.  They would have the gum made through a cooperative arrangement with Amurol, a Wrigley Gum subsidiary.  Reed's Candy was sold to Amurol in 1989, but the deal did not include the gum, retained by a newly rechristened Clark Gum Company.  Clark's Teaberry gum is currently marketed by First Source, LLC in Buffalo, New York, and made in Mexico.

Clark products over the years

Candies
Alligator Eggs
Banana Caramels
Black Jack Caramels
Boomer
Bun (vanilla, maple and caramel flavors)
Chocolate Chips
Chocolate Malted Milk Balls
Clarconut
Clark (original)
Clark Coconut
Clark Dark 
Clark Light
Clark's Miami Coconut
Clark Mint
Clark's Wintergreen
Coconut Frosted Creams
Crispy
Crunchy 
Fudge Bar
Honest Square
Iceland Sandwich
Mario Bun, named for Mario Lemieux
Mint Appetizers
Nutcracker
Peanut Blossom Kisses
Peanut Butter Log
Reggie!
Sassy
Sour Cherry Crème
Sour Grape Crème
Sour Lemon Crème
Spanish Chips
Sunpower
Wild Cherry Caramels
Winter Clark
Zagnut (now made by Hershey's)
Zig Zag

Clark's gum flavors
Cinnamint
Cinnamon
Diet Spearmint
Freshmint
Fruit Punch
Peppermint
Smile Sugar Free (various flavors)
Sour Cherry
Sour Lemon
Sweetwood
Teaberry
Tendermint
Winter Green

References

External links
 A Short History of Clark's Teaberry Chewing Gum

Defunct companies based in Pennsylvania
Food and drink companies established in 1886
Confectionery companies of the United States
Chocolate companies based in Pennsylvania
Buildings and structures completed in 1924
Pittsburgh History & Landmarks Foundation Historic Landmarks
1886 establishments in Pennsylvania
1955 mergers and acquisitions